Turris vermicularis is an extinct species of sea snail, a marine gastropod mollusk in the family Turridae, the turrids.

Description

Distribution
This extinct marine species was found in Miocene strata off Turin, Italy and off Letkés, Hungary.

References

 de Grateloup, J. P. S. "Description d'un genre nouveau de coquille, appele Neritopsis." Actes de la societe Iinneenne de Bordeaus 5 (1832): 125–131.

External links
 Marta Zunino $ Giulio Pavia, Lower to middle Miocene mollusc assemblages from the Torino hills (NW Italy): Synthesis of new data and chronostratigraphical arrangement; Rivista Italiana di Paleontologia e Stratigrafia 115(3):349-370 (2009)
 Auckland Museum: collection
 MNHN, Paris: Pleurotoma vermicularis

vermicularis
Gastropods described in 1832